"Broadway Girls" is a song by American rapper Lil Durk, featuring vocals from American country music singer Morgan Wallen. It was released on December 17, 2021, through Alamo as the second single from Durk's seventh studio album, 7220 (2022). "Broadway Girls" is a hip hop and country drill song and also serves as the first time that Wallen had sung on a trap beat.

Background
On October 1, 2021, Wallen posted a teaser clip on Instagram with the caption: "IDK what this is or what it's for but sounds bout right". He explained the inspiration was from Nashville's Broadway street, with the lyrics telling the story of going to a SoBro bar owned by fellow American country music singer Jason Aldean. The song described Wallen on "a night out in Downtown Nashville with a girl that he met at 'Aldeans'".

Critical reception
TMZ wrote that "it's way more hip-hop flavored than country". Filiz Mustafa of HITC commented that "the rap and country crossover blends Morgan and Lil Durk's distinctive voices and styles in a surprisingly good way".

Music video
The official music video, directed by Jerry Productions and Justin Clough, was released on December 20, 2021. It was filmed on Nashville's Broadway Street, which was closed down for the shoot. Durk and Wallen visit Jason Aldean's Kitchen + Rooftop bar and also walk down the empty Broadway block.

Commercial performance
The song also went viral on video-sharing app TikTok, where it has over 84.5 million views. It debuted at number 14 on the US Billboard Hot 100, giving Durk his highest-charting song as a lead artist. It also debuted at number one on the Billboard Hot R&B/Hip-Hop Songs chart, making Wallen the fourth country artist in history to reach the achievement.

Charts

Weekly charts

Year-end charts

Certifications

References

2021 singles
2021 songs
Lil Durk songs
Morgan Wallen songs
Songs written by Lil Durk
Songs written by Morgan Wallen
Country rap songs